The Welsh Revenue Authority is a non-ministerial department of the Welsh Government responsible for the administration and collection of devolved taxes in Wales.

The Welsh Revenue Authority is accountable to the Senedd.

History

For over 800 years most taxes in Wales had been collected by the UK Government. The Welsh Revenue Authority was formed in 2017 as the first non-ministerial government department of the Welsh Government, in anticipation of it becoming responsible for collecting taxes devolved to the Senedd under the terms of the Wales Act 2014 and 2017. The 2017 Act also gave the Senedd powers to vary the basic rate of income tax by 10p, but this will be administered by HMRC. 

The Tax Collection and Management (Wales) Act 2016, which establishes the legal basis for the operation of the Welsh Revenue Authority, was passed by the Welsh Parliament in April 2016.

The Welsh Revenue Authority was officially established to collect Wales' newly devolved taxes – the first Welsh-wide tax collection system for over 800 years.

Devolved taxes

The Wales Act 2014 and Wales Act 2017 devolved the following taxes to the Welsh Parliament: 

 Non Domestic Rates in Wales – from 1 April 2015
 Land Transaction Tax (LTT) – from 1 April 2018
 Landfill Disposals Tax (LDT) – from 1 April 2018
 Welsh Rates of Income Tax (WRIT) – from 1 April 2019

The relevant legislation governing the Welsh Revenue Authority and Welsh taxes are:

 Tax Collection and Management (Wales) Act 2016
 Land Transaction Tax and Anti-avoidance of Devolved Taxes (Wales) Act 2017
 Landfill Disposals Tax (Wales) Act 2017

Governance structure

The minister responsible for the Welsh Revenue Authority is the Minister for Finance, Rebecca Evans MS. Dyfed Alsop was appointed as CEO to lead the organisation 

The board of the Welsh Revenue Authority is composed of six members. Its main role is to develop and approve the Welsh Revenue Authority's overall strategy, approve final business plans and advise the Chief Executive on key appointments. It also performs an assurance role and advises on best practice.

Board 

Kathryn Bishop was appointed as chair. The board members currently are:
 Kathryn Bishop CBE, Chair
 Dyfed Edwards, Deputy Chair
 Dyfed Alsop, Chief Executive
 Jocelyn Davies, Non-Executive Member
 David Jones, Non-Executive Member
 Lakshmi Narain, Non-Executive Member

Selection of head office

 
There was a three phase process in the selection the head office of the authority. Phase 1 and 2 drew up a short-list of viable locations from within the Welsh Government estate. This considered six properties located in Sarn Mynach in Llandudno Junction, Rhodfa Padarn in Aberystwyth, Rhydycar Business Park in Merthyr Tydfil, the QED Centre in Treforest (near Pontypridd), Cathays Park in Cardiff and  Picton Terrace in Carmarthen. 

Phase three of the process appraised the short-listed locations based on three agreed critical of the ability to attract and retain a skilled workforce, the proximity to stakeholders and the proximity to customers. From this process three Welsh Government offices were available which could have potentially met the criteria, Cathays Park, Rhydycar Business Park and the QED Centre. The Rhydycar Business Park site was assessed as being higher risk in its ability to attract key skills and being its location in relation to its customer base. The QED Centre near Pontypridd was ultimately chosen as the site of the authority.

See also
 HM Revenue and Customs
 Revenue Scotland

References

Non-ministerial departments of the Welsh Government
Taxation in Wales
Revenue services
Government agencies established in 2017
Articles containing video clips